Thomas Henchman was launched in 1802 at Calcutta as a "country ship", that is, a merchant vessel trading in the East Indies, but not between India and England. She was wrecked in 1811 while preparing to participate in a British invasion of Java.

In 1809 William Hodges was captain of Thomas Henchman.

Thomas Henchman was to participate as one of the transports in the British reduction of Java, under the auspices of Lord Minto. 

Thomas Henchman was burned, or wrecked on a reef in the Strait of Malacca in July 1811.

Citations and references
Citations

References
 
 
 

1802 ships
British ships built in India
Age of Sail merchant ships
Maritime incidents in 1811
Shipwrecks in the Strait of Malacca